Buster Davis may refer to:

Buster Davis (composer) (1918–1987), American Broadway theatre composer, songwriter, arranger and conductor, see Doctor Jazz
Buster Davis (wide receiver), American football wide receiver
Buster Davis (linebacker), American football linebacker